Željka Krizmanić (born 1 April 1987 in Zagreb, Croatia) is a Croatian former figure skater. She is a three-time national bronze medalist and a two-time national silver medalist.

External links
 

Croatian female single skaters
1987 births
Living people
Sportspeople from Zagreb